Amylostereum chailletii is a species of crust fungus. It was originally described in 1822 as Thelephora chailletii by Christian Hendrik Persoon in 1822, and given its current name when it was moved into Amylostereum by Jacques Boidin in 1958. It causes a white rot, especially in spruce and fir species.

References

External links

Russulales
Fungi of Europe
Fungi of North America
Fungi described in 1822
Taxa named by Christiaan Hendrik Persoon